The United States Rugby Players Association, also referred to as the USRPA, is the union of professional Major League Rugby players.

United States Rugby Players Association is a member of International Rugby Players Association (IRPA).

References

External links
 

Major League Rugby
Rugby union players representative bodies
Year of establishment missing
Sports trade unions of the United States